Olympic Council may refer to:

 Olympic Council of Asia, a governing body of sports in Asia
 Olympic Council of Ireland, the national Olympic Committee for Ireland
 Singapore National Olympic Council, a registered society